The State Highways of the Republic of Turkey, abbreviated as T.C.K. are an integrated network of highways and roads in Turkey, consisting of a numbered grid spanning across the country. They are more commonly called State roads and are the primary road network in Turkey. The network is mostly maintained by the General Directorate of Highways (KGM), except for within large cities where the respective city municipality assumes responsibility.

In the early 21st century, the network was greatly expanded to accommodate four-lane highways throughout the country. As of 2021,  of the total  system are four-lane highways.

System Overview

Unlike motorways in Turkey, state highways do not have a minimum design standard. Despite the majority of the system consisting of four-lane, dual highways, other routes can be two-lane highways or even dirt roads, in mountainous areas. Some routes, especially within major cities, have been upgraded to controlled access highway standards; while other routes, such as the D.650, between Arifiye and Bozüyük, and the D.200, between Eskişehir and Ankara, consist of minimal at-grade intersections. Bridges and Tunnels are common among the system, yet not as plentiful as on motorways.

Numbering

All state highways have a three-digit designation preceded by a D. The system is numbered based on direction and location. Route numbers range from 010 to 977, while 010 to 490 are east-west routes and 505 to 977 are north-south routes. Odd-numbered routes generally run north-south, while even-numbered routes generally run east-west. The only exception to this rule are four north-south routes, D.550, D.650, D.750, D.850 and D.950, that have even-number designations. The second criterion is based on the geographical location of the route. For north-south roads, routes in the west will have lower numbers, while routes in the east have higher numbers. For east-west roads, routes in the north will have lower numbers that get higher towards the south.  

Main roads are designated as multiples of 100 and 50, with the exception being D.010. Multiples of 100 are main east-west roads, while multiples of 50 are main north-south roads. D.010 is the only exception to this rule.

See also
List of otoyol routes in Turkey
Transport in Turkey
List of highways in Turkey
Otoyol
List of countries by road network size Turkey, 19th

References

Turkey
Highways
Turkey transport-related lists